Bogusław Fornalczyk (born 3 June 1937) is a retired Polish cyclist. He competed at the 1960 Summer Olympics in the road race and 100 km team time trial and finished in 11th and 10th place, respectively. He won the race Polska – Ukraina in 1958, 1959 and 1961, as well as the Tour de Pologne in 1958.

During his career, Fornalczyk won five national titles (1958–1961) and took part in four world championships (1958, 1959, 1961, 1962) and six Peace Races (1958–1963). He graduated from a mining school. He is married and has two daughters, Bożenę and Ewę. He lives in Bedzin.

References

External links

1937 births
Living people
Cyclists at the 1960 Summer Olympics
Olympic cyclists of Poland
Polish male cyclists
People from Myszków County
Sportspeople from Silesian Voivodeship